Susan Elizabeth Garden, Baroness Garden of Frognal, PC (born Button, 22 February 1944) is a British Liberal Democrat politician who, since 2018, serves as Deputy Speaker of the House of Lords.

Career 
Educated at Westonbirt School and St Hilda's College, Oxford, she entered the teaching profession, becoming Hon FCIL in 2012.

Lady Garden stood as the Liberal Democrat parliamentary candidate for Finchley and Golders Green (London) in 2005.   In September 2007 she was created a Life Peer as Baroness Garden of Frognal, of Hampstead in the London Borough of Camden.

Lady Garden is a former Government Whip and Spokesperson for the Department for Digital, Culture, Media and Sport, for Department for Business, Innovation and Skills and (Higher Education) Department for Education.

Personal life
Lady Garden married in 1965 Timothy Garden later Air Marshal the Baron Garden KCB. Lord Garden died on 9 August 2007, by whom she has two daughters.

Styles
 Mrs Timothy Garden (1965–1994)
 Lady Garden (1994–2004)
 The Rt Hon. The Lady Garden (2004–2007)
 The Rt Hon. The Baroness Garden of Frognal (2007–2015)
 The Rt Hon. The Baroness Garden of Frognal, PC (2015–)

References

External links
 Baroness Garden of Frognal on Parliament.uk
 Susan Garden, Baroness Garden of Frognal on The Peerage website
 The Times Online coverage of Baron Garden's funeral

1944 births
Living people
People from Hampstead
People from Camden Town
People educated at Westonbirt School
Alumni of St Hilda's College, Oxford
Garden of Frognal
Life peeresses created by Elizabeth II
Members of the Privy Council of the United Kingdom
Spouses of life peers
Wives of knights